Colpodes elegans is a species of ground beetles (insects in the family Carabidae).

References

External links 
 Colpodes elegans at carabidae.org

Platyninae
Beetles described in 1929
Taxa named by Herbert Edward Andrewes